Les S. Thomas (born December 10, 1945) is an American businessman and politician serving as a member of the Kent City Council since 2004. A member of the Republican Party prior to 2014 and an Independent since 2014, he previously served as a member of the King County Council and the Washington House of Representatives.

References

King County Councillors
1945 births
Republican Party members of the Washington House of Representatives
20th-century American politicians
21st-century American politicians
Living people